A list of the films produced in Mexico in 1959 (see 1959 in film):

1959

See also
1959 in Mexico

External links

1959
Films
Mexican